Darcy Lever railway station served the Darcy Lever area of eastern Bolton between 1848 and 1951.

History
The station opened on 20 November 1848. It was on the Bury– section of the Liverpool & Bury Railway, which opened on the same day.

This viaduct, together with a shorter one of similar construction on the same line (over the River Croal at Burnden) was claimed by the Bolton Chronicle (18 November 1848) to be "the first of their kind in England".

The station closed on 29 October 1951.

See also
 List of lattice girder bridges in the United Kingdom

References

External links
Darcy Lever Station on navigable 1948 O.S. map

Disused railway stations in the Metropolitan Borough of Bolton
Former Lancashire and Yorkshire Railway stations
Railway stations in Great Britain opened in 1848
Railway stations in Great Britain closed in 1951